Nigadi is a village in Dharwad district of Karnataka, India.

Demographics 
As of the 2011 Census of India there were 479 households in Nigadi and a total population of 2,295 consisting of 1,193 males and 1,102 females. There were 299 children ages 0-6.

References

Villages in Dharwad district